Gymnobela leptoglypta is a species of sea snail, a marine gastropod mollusk in the family Raphitomidae.

Description
The length of the shell attains 4.5 mm.

The somewhat thin shell has a well-elevated spire. Its color is white with the protoconch stained with brown. The shell contains six evenly roundedwhorls, four being apical. The apical whorls (in a worn state) are reticulate, and the residue of the shell is sculptured with longitudinal ribs, which fade out on the lower half of the whorls. There are also numerous rounded spirals cutting the ribs. Below the suture there is an excavated area, showing spirals and also arcuate striae, more numerous than the ribs. The columella is fairly straight. The aperture is ovate.

Distribution
This marine species occurs off the Azores and in the Rockall Trough.

References

 Gofas, S.; Le Renard, J.; Bouchet, P. (2001). Mollusca. in: Costello, M.J. et al. (eds), European Register of Marine Species: a check-list of the marine species in Europe and a bibliography of guides to their identification. Patrimoines Naturels. 50: 180-213

External links
 P. & Fischer H. (1896). Dragages effectués par l'Hirondelle et par la Princesse Alice 1888-1895. 1. Mollusques Gastéropodes. Mémoires de la Société Zoologique de France. 395-498, pl. 15-22://biodiversitylibrary.org/page/10117292]
Bouchet &  Warren, Revision of the North-East Atlantic bathyal and abyssal Turridae (Mollusca, Gastropoda); The Journal of Molluscan Studies, supplement 8, December 1980
 

leptoglypta
Gastropods described in 1896